Louis Frank Dula (March 23, 1912 – March 26, 1979) was a Negro leagues pitcher, mostly for the Homestead Grays.

References

External links
 and Baseball-Reference Black Baseball stats and Seamheads

Homestead Grays players
Baseball players from Cincinnati
1912 births
1979 deaths
20th-century African-American sportspeople